Tyro is character in Greek mythology.

Tyro may also refer to:
 Tyro, a pen-name used by H. G. Wells for The Devotee of Art
 Tyro, a beginner or novice

Places
 Tyro, Kansas, United States
 Tyro, Mississippi, United States
 Tyro, North Carolina, United States
 Tyro, Virginia, United States

Other uses
 Tyro Payments, an Australian bank specialising in Small and Medium Enterprises (SMEs)
 Tyro Stakes, an American Thoroughbred horse race
 Tyro (Final Fantasy), the main character in Final Fantasy Record Keeper
 Theodore Tyro, a Christian saint

See also 
 Tiro (disambiguation)
 Tyrol (disambiguation)